CPPA is an acronym that may refer to:

 Constant purchasing power accounting
 Child Pornography Prevention Act of 1996
 Cameroon Press Photo Archive
California Privacy Protection Agency